Lola Marsh is an Israeli indie pop band from Tel Aviv. The band was formed as a duo in 2013 by Gil Landau (guitars, keyboards) and Yael Shoshana Cohen (vocals), and was quickly signed by the indie label Anova Music. The group released their first EP, You're Mine, under Universal Records-Barclay in January 2016.

History 
Gil Landau and Yael Shoshana Cohen met in Tel Aviv through mutual friends. The idea of the group was conceived at Landau's birthday party in February 2011, when the band members began playing songs on Landau's father's old guitar.

Landau and Shoshana dated briefly while forming the band, but went back to being bandmates.

Landau and Cohen wrote and performed songs for 18 months before bringing on additional musicians. Mati Gilad (Bass), Rami Osservaser (Guitar, Keyboards), Dekel Dvir (Drums and samplers) joined them shortly after. The group started performing in local clubs. They were spotted by the leading local indie label Anova Music who signed the band. The band's name was arrived at when the members were calling out possible names for the group and the name Lola Marsh was suggested and stuck.

The duo gained notoriety on the heels of their 2014 performance at Primavera Sound Festival.

The band premiered their first single, "Sirens", via Nylon Magazine in March 2015; Nylon said of the song: "The Dreamy Tel Aviv Band's latest song, "Sirens", offers a twist on the typical sweet-yet-gritty indie sound...The track seems ready made for Quentin Tarantino's next film score." The song was later featured in the American TV show Scream.

The band's second single, "You're Mine", was released in May 2015 via Pigeons and Plane. It garnered over six million plays on Spotify and landed in the service's top 3 Most Viral Tracks as well as in the top 3 of Hype Machine's Most Popular Tracks ranking.

Lola Marsh's debut EP, You're Mine, was released in January 2016. Their third single, "She's a Rainbow", was released in May 2016. In March 2017 Their Single "Wishing Girl" was released and was accompanied with a video directed by Gal Muggia. The Band's debut album, Remember Roses, was released in June 2017 via Universal Records-Barclay, Sony ATV, Verve and Anova Music.

Following the album release the band toured Europe and the US playing summer festivals such as Paleo festival. Montreal Jazz Festival, Sziget festival.

In February 2018, the band released a live session recorded at Capitol Records Los Angeles. Lola Marsh was featured on NPR's The Austin 100 in March 2018 as part of a SXSW event feature. Later that month, the duo performed multiple shows at SXSW.

The band's cover of "Somethin' Stupid" featured in the eponymous episode of Better Call Saul in 2018, and an instrumental version was played in "Bad Choice Road" in 2020.

Their second album, Someday Tomorrow Maybe, was released in January 2020. Their music videos ''Echoes'' and ''Only for a Moment'' were recognized by international festival Berlin Music Video Awards in 2020. ''Echoes'' won the Best Song category and ''Only for a Moment'' placed second in the Best Cinematography category.

Musical influences 
They cite Sufjan Stevens, Nina Simone, Fleet Foxes, Elvis Presley, Moody Blues, Bon Iver, MGMT and LCD Soundsystem as major influences on their music.

Discography 
Albums
 Remember Roses (2017)
 Someday Tomorrow Maybe (2020)
  Shot Shot Cherry (2022)

EP
 You're Mine (2016)

References

External links 
 

Israeli pop music groups
Musical groups established in 2013
Musical groups from Tel Aviv
2013 establishments in Israel